The American Journal of Philology is a quarterly academic journal established in 1880 by the classical scholar Basil Lanneau Gildersleeve and published by the Johns Hopkins University Press. It covers the field of philology, and related areas of classical literature, linguistics, history, philosophy, and cultural studies. In 2003, the journal received the award for Best Single Issue from the Professional and Scholarly Publishing Division of the Association of American Publishers. The current editor-in-chief is Joseph Farrell (University of Pennsylvania).

Editors:

 Basil Lanneau Gildersleeve (1880 - 1919)
 C.W.E. Miller (1920 - 1934)
 Benjamin Dean Meritt (1934 - 1935, 1943 - 1946)
 Tenney Frank (1936 - 1939) 
 Harold Cherniss   (1940 - 1942) 
 Henry T. Rowell (1946 - 1971) 
 Georg Luck
 David H. J. Larmour
 Joseph Farrell

References

External links 
 
American Journal of Philology  at Project MUSE

Publications established in 1880
English-language journals
Quarterly journals
Johns Hopkins University Press academic journals
Classics journals